Ames True Temper is a multinational corporation headquartered in Camp Hill, Pennsylvania, USA.  It is a wholly owned subsidiary of Griffon Corporation.  Ames True Temper specializes in the manufacture of non-powered lawn and garden products. Their manufacturing plant is located in Harrisburg, Pennsylvania, and produces 85% of the wheelbarrows in the United States and Canada producing 1.7 million wheelbarrows each year. The Harrisburg plant has been in continual operation since 1876.

Ames , which celebrated its 200th anniversary in 1974, is among the oldest still-extant business corporations in the United States as well as one of the oldest companies in the World.

History

Formation
Blacksmith and pioneer Captain John Ames began making metal shovels in America in 1774.
Ames underwent a merger in 1931 including Baldwin Tool Works of Parkersburg, West Virginia, the Ames Shovel and Tool Company of North Easton, Massachusetts; the Wyoming Shovel Works of Wyoming, Pennsylvania; Hubbard & Co. of Pittsburgh, Pennsylvania; and the Pittsburgh Shovel Co. of Pittsburgh, Pennsylvania.  It later absorbed the Skelton Shovel Co. Inc. of Dunkirk, New York. The result of the merger was called the Ames Shovel and Tool Company.  The company was renamed the Ames, Baldwin, Wyoming Company in 1933.  In 1952, it became known as the O. Ames Company.

The Old Stone Forge of Wallingford, Vermont, founded in 1808, became the American Fork and Hoe Co.  In 1949, the name was changed to True Temper.  Ames purchased True Temper from the Huffy Corporation in 1999 to become Ames True Temper.

In 2002 Ames, then based in Camp Hill, Pennsylvania closed one of its two plants manufacturing lawn and garden tools in Wood County, West Virginia.

Problems and controversies
Ames True Temper Company closed its facility in West Virginia in September 2005, unable to reach a contract agreement with the United Steelworkers Union.

Brands
Ames True Temper currently owns the following brands:
 Ames
 ClosetMaid
 Dynamic Design
 Garant
 Harper
 Hound Dog
 Jackson
 Razor-Back
 Southern Patio
 True Temper
 Union Tools
 Westmix

AMES Australasia
currently owns the following brands:
Cyclone Fence & Gate Company
Hills
Nylex
Kelso
Northcote Pottery
Tuscan Path
Trojan Tools
Supercraft
Gardenmaster
Westmix
La Hacienda

See also
 Oliver Ames, Jr.
 Oakes Ames
 Ames Shovel Shop

References

External links 

Garden tool manufacturers
Camp Hill, Pennsylvania
Manufacturing companies based in Pennsylvania
Companies established in 1774
Companies based in Cumberland County, Pennsylvania
1770s establishments in Pennsylvania
Tool manufacturing companies of Australia
Australian subsidiaries of foreign companies